The Academy of Canadian Cinema and Television's Award for Best Short Documentary is an annual Canadian film award, presented to a film judged to be the year's best short documentary film. Prior to 2012 the award was presented as part of the Genie Awards program; since 2012 it has been presented as part of the expanded Canadian Screen Awards.

The award has not always been presented at every past Genie or CSA ceremony. In years when the award was not presented, short documentary films were instead eligible for the Best Theatrical Short Film and/or Best (Theatrical/Feature-Length) Documentary categories. In the Canadian Film Awards era, it was often presented solely under the name Best Documentary, but was still presented to shorter documentaries and remained separate from the category for Best Theatrical Documentary.

1960s

1970s

1980s

1990s

2000s

2010s

2020s

See also
Prix Iris for Best Short Documentary

References

 
Canadian documentary film awards
Short documentary